My System is a book on chess theory written by Aron Nimzowitsch. Originally over a series of five brochures from 1925 to 1927, the book—one of the early works on hypermodernism—introduced many new concepts to followers of the modern school of thought. It is generally considered to be one of the most important books in the history of chess.

Contents
The book is divided into three parts: "The Elements", "Positional Play", and "Illustrative Games".

The Elements
In "The Elements", Nimzowitsch writes about the basics of his "system". He regards the following as the elements of chess strategy:
 The center
 Play on the open files
 Play on the seventh and eighth ranks
 The passed pawns
 The pin
 Discovered checks
 Exchanging
 The pawn-chain

Positional Play
The next part, "Positional Play", is based largely on the elements taught in the first part. In it, Nimzowitsch tells how to play for a positional advantage. In particular, he argues that the center can be effectively controlled using pieces instead of pawns. This concept, now widely accepted, is one of the fundamental principles of hypermodernism.

Illustrative Games
"Illustrative Games" contains annotated versions of fifty of Nimzowitsch's career games, which he refers to throughout the text.

Editions

 The original German edition was published in 1925.
 In 1929, a British English edition titled My System, translated by Philip Hereford, was published by G. Bell and Sons, Ltd. A second printing was published in 1938 and included an errata sheet. This edition is out-of-print.
 In 1930, an American edition was published by Harcourt, Brace & Co. This edition was reprinted with an errata sheet circa 1938. This edition is out-of-print.  
 In 1947, a U.S. edition edited by Fred Reinfeld derived from Harcourt, Brace & Co. and published by David McKay Co.; reprinted 1950 (undated), 1967, 1970, 1972 under the imprimatur of Tartan Books, and in a 1975 paperback in the 'McKay Chess Library.' Translated by Philip Hereford (1929). The translator notes the addition of several games, and the removal (with author's permission) of several passages, from the German edition.
 In 1987, B.T Batsford Ltd, London reprinted the 1929 edition by Philip Hereford, entitled My System A Chess treatise by Aron Nimzowitsch.
 In 1991, an American English edition titled My System: 21st Century Edition, edited by Lou Hays, was published by Hays Publishing. In this edition, descriptive notation used in previous English editions was replaced by algebraic notation and many diagrams have been added.
 In 2007, a British edition titled My System, newly translated by Ian Adams, published by Quality Chess  It includes an essay by Nimzowitsch, tables of his chess results, and other new material.
 In 2009, a German edition titled Mein System, published by Rattmann.
 In 2009, a Spanish edition titled Mi sistema, translated by Antonio Gude. Ed. 'La Casa del Ajedrez'. Madrid.

References
 

1925 non-fiction books
Chess books
Chess in Germany
1925 in chess
1930 in chess